Edgardo Jose Santiago Valenciano (born August 6, 1964), also known as Gary V., is a Filipino singer-songwriter, dancer, musician, actor, music producer and television host. Valenciano has released 39 albums, and won the Awit Award for "Best Male Performer" twelve times.

He is currently part of ABS-CBN's contract artists, having been a mainstay of the Sunday noontime musical variety show ASAP and the noontime, weekday singing contest segment of It's Showtime. Valenciano is frequently tapped to sing theme songs for the network's soap operas and in-house film arm, Star Cinema. Aside from music, he is UNICEF Philippines' first National Ambassador, since 1998.

Valenciano was given the ASAP Elite Platinum Circle Award several times for his achievements in the local music industry. In his 34 years in the music industry, he has been awarded multi-platinum recording awards for most of his full-length studio albums.

Early life and education
Gary Valenciano was born in Santa Mesa district of City of Manila on August 6, 1964. He is the sixth of seven children of Vicente Calacas Valenciano, a Bicolano from Camalig, Albay and Grimilda Santiago y Olmo (1934–2019) from Arecibo, Puerto Rico. His parents met in New York City, married, and settled in Manila. His mother is a Puerto Rican of Italian descent who sang opera in Manila during the 1960s. Valenciano attended primary and secondary school in La Salle Green Hills.

Career

In 1978, at 14 years old, Valenciano made his first television appearance in an advertisement for Fress Gusto, a now-discontinued soft drink sold by San Miguel Corporation.

He started as a choir singer, then launched his career in singing and show business on May 13, 1983. He first appeared as a solo artist in 1982 in the television programme The Pilita and Jackie Show, and later in Germspesyal and Penthouse Live.

He had his first solo concert in April 1984 at the Araneta Coliseum, followed by a number of albums. Three of his albums were released internationally, including the Christian-inspired album Out of the Dark.  He won the Awit Award twelve times in the "Best Male Recording" category alone. He has been called "Mr. Pure Energy" due to his high energy dance performances in concerts.

As an actor, he won the "Best Single Performance by an Actor" trophy when he performed in a drama television movie for GMA7 in the 90s. He has appeared in 14 full-length films as the lead actor for some of the top movie companies like Viva Films, Regal Films, Seiko Films, and Star Cinema, with leading ladies like Vilma Santos, Maricel Soriano, Lorna Tolentino, Kris Aquino, Sharon Cuneta, Gretchen Barretto, Princess Punzalan, and Ms. Universe 1993 Dayanara Torres.

As an inspirational artist, he recorded a number of Christian albums and was chosen to do a music video for the Billy Graham Evangelistic Association (BGEA) for a song he co-wrote, "Could You Be Messiah," in 1994. He was then tapped for Global Mission in Puerto Rico in 1994 where he performed with Michael W. Smith and Steve Green. BGEA tapped him as well as in Amsterdam 2000 where he performed for over 10,500 evangelists. He is a member of the Board of Trustees of Christian Broadcasting Network, producers of The 700 Club. He performed at the 50th anniversary of CBN in Virginia Beach and has guested on The 700 Club USA many times.

As a performing artist, he was called the "Michael Jackson of the Philippines" in the 80s and 90s, and continues to hold concerts all over the world. He has sold-out venues and theatres in the Philippines and all over the world, performing in venues like the Shrine Auditorium and Microsoft Theater in California, the Roy Thompson Hall in Canada, the Budokhan Hall in Japan, the Navy Pier in Chicago, and the Sydney Entertainment Center and Hillsong Auditorium in Australia. He has performed all over the world, including in the US, Canada, Hong Kong, Japan, Korea, China, Malaysia, Thailand, Indonesia, Singapore, Brunei, Taiwan, Papua New Guinea, New Zealand, Australia, Israel, Puerto Rico, Saudi Arabia, Dubai, Bahrain, Abu Dhabi, Al Ain, Oman, Qatar, Paris, London, Finland, Norway, Ireland, Germany, Spain, Switzerland, Italy, and Amsterdam.

In 1998, he became UNICEF Philippines' first National Ambassador. In 2006, the Doha Asian Games Organising Committee has named Gary Valenciano the official performer of the Asian Games' theme song, "Side By Side". In 2008, he marked his tenth year as a UNICEF Ambassador with a visit to Sitio Avocado, a former war zone in Negros Oriental.

Valenciano returned to acting in 2008 by appearing in the drama anthology Maalaala Mo Kaya, where he portrayed a prisoner who finds religion and becomes a born again Christian. That same year, he was nominated for "Best Single Performance by an Actor" in the 22nd PMPC Star Awards for TV.

In 2009, Valenciano released a collaborative album with Martin Nievera called As 1, with the carrier single of the same title.

In 2010, Valenciano was in a Holy Week drama special, Gulong ("Wheel"), a CBN Asia production shown on GMA.

For his 25th anniversary in 2008, STAR RECORDS, the music arm of ABSCBN, released GV 25, a compilation of songs he composed and recorded sung by music stars of the Philippines like Sharon Cuneta, Rachel Ann Go, Martin Nievera, Piolo Pascual, Jed Madela, Erik Santos, and Christian Bautista.

For his 30th anniversary in 2013, his concert ARISE, which was originally staged at the Araneta Coliseum for two nights and restaged at the MOA ARENA to a jam-packed audience, won as PMPC's Best Concert of the Year. His album With You won the Best Inspirational Album for the same year at the Catholic Mass Media Awards.

Philanthropy
Valenciano formed the Shining Light Foundation in 1989, focusing on supporting diabetics and a scholarship program that has produced many multi-awarded scholars and students.

Personal life
Valenciano married Maria Anna Elizabeth "Angeli" Pangilinan, the sister of senator Francis Pangilinan, on August 6, 1984. Together, they have three children: Paolo Valenciano, a director and the vocalist of the band Salamin; Gabriel Valenciano, a singer, keyboardist, dancer, and director; and Kiana Valenciano, a model and singer-songwriter. The family resides in Antipolo.

He is currently living with type 1 diabetes, and has been an endorser for several wellness products related to the condition. In May 2018, Valenciano started feeling ill after a performance with his son Gabriel for the celebration of his 35th anniversary in showbiz in ABS-CBN's top-rating Sunday afternoon show, ASAP, and had to undergo open heart surgery due to blockage of his left anterior descending artery caused by his diabetes. The procedure was successfully performed on May 6, 2018, and he was released from the hospital by May 12.

On April 17, 2019, Valenciano's mother died in Orlando, Florida, after battling pneumonia, congestive heart failure, and H1N1 flu.

Discography

Filmography

Movies

Television

Awards and nominations

Music

Film and television

FAMAS

|-
||1988|| Ibulong mo sa Diyos ||Best Theme Song|| 
|-
||1995|| Sana Maulit Muli ||Best Theme Song|| 
|-
||2000|| || Dr. Ciriaco Santiago Memorial Award || 
|-
||2006|| "Ikaw Lamang" for the movie Dubai ||Best Theme Song|| 
|}

Golden Screen TV Awards

|-
||2006|| Ikaw Lamang ||  Best Theme Song|| 
|-
||2011|| ASAP Rocks ||  Outstanding Male Host in a Musical or Variety Program||  
|-
||2013|| I Do Bidoo Bidoo: Heto nAPO Sila! ||  Best Performance by an Actor in a Lead Role-Musical or Comedy|| 
|}

Other accolades
 First artist in the world to have a Sennheiser Special Edition microphone named after him – Sennheiser Evolution Series 2001
 First and current UNICEF National Ambassador of Goodwill in the Philippines, 1998–present

References

External links

Gary Valenciano's Official Website

1964 births
Living people
Bicolano actors
Filipino evangelicals
Filipino OPM composers
Filipino film score composers
Filipino male film actors
20th-century Filipino male singers
21st-century Filipino male singers
Filipino Pentecostals
Filipino people of Italian descent
Filipino people of Puerto Rican descent
Filipino pop singers
Filipino male television actors
Converts to evangelical Christianity from Roman Catholicism
People from Santa Mesa
Singers from Manila
Male actors from Manila
Performers of Christian music
English-language singers from the Philippines
Tagalog-language singers
Tenors
UNICEF Goodwill Ambassadors
Universal Records (Philippines) artists
Star Music artists
ABS-CBN personalities
GMA Network personalities
Male film score composers
Pangilinan family